Lucas Martínez Ruiz (born 17 November 1993) is an Argentine field hockey player who plays as a forward for Belgian club Dragons and the Argentine national team.

Club career
Martínez played for Club Ferrocarril Mitre in Argentina before he moved to Europe to play for Club de Campo in Madrid, Spain. The forward scored eight goals in his first season in Europe. He left the Madrid-based club in 2016 to play for HGC in the Netherlands. After two seasons with HGC, he transferred to HC Oranje-Rood from Eindhoven to replace his fellow-countrymen Agustín Mazzilli. With Oranje-Rood he made his debut in the Euro Hockey League. It was announced in May 2020 that he would join Dragons in Belgium for the 2020–21 season.

International career
Martínez played with the Argentina U21 squad at the 2012 Pan American Junior Championship, the 2013 Sultan of Johor Cup, and the 2013 Junior World Cup before he made his debut for the main squad in 2014 at the 2014 South American Games. He won the gold medal at that tournament and made four goals. He was also part of the Argentina squad which won the bronze medal at the 2014 World Cup, which was his first World Cup. In 2018 he was selected for the 2018 World Cup, where he scored two goals in four matches. In July 2019, he was selected in the Argentina squad for the 2019 Pan American Games. They won the gold medal by defeating Canada 5–2 in the final.

References

External links

1993 births
Living people
Argentine male field hockey players
Field hockey players from Buenos Aires
Male field hockey forwards
Competitors at the 2014 South American Games
2014 Men's Hockey World Cup players
2018 Men's Hockey World Cup players
Field hockey players at the 2019 Pan American Games
South American Games medalists in field hockey
South American Games gold medalists for Argentina
Pan American Games medalists in field hockey
Pan American Games gold medalists for Argentina
Club de Campo Villa de Madrid players
HGC players
HC Oranje-Rood players
KHC Dragons players
Men's Belgian Hockey League players
División de Honor de Hockey Hierba players
Men's Hoofdklasse Hockey players
Expatriate field hockey players
Argentine expatriate sportspeople in Spain
Argentine expatriate sportspeople in Belgium
Argentine expatriate sportspeople in the Netherlands
Medalists at the 2019 Pan American Games
Field hockey players at the 2020 Summer Olympics
Olympic field hockey players of Argentina